A California hurricane is a tropical cyclone that affects the state of California. Usually, only the remnants of tropical cyclones affect California. Since 1900, only two still-tropical storms have hit California, one by direct landfall from offshore, another after making landfall in Mexico. No tropical cyclone has ever made landfall in California at hurricane intensity in recorded history. 

Since 1850, only eight tropical cyclones have brought gale-force winds to the Southwestern United States. They are: The 1858 San Diego hurricane that was reconstructed as just missing landfall in 1858, the 1939 Long Beach tropical storm that made landfall near San Pedro in 1939, the remnants of Tropical Storm Jennifer-Katherine in 1963, the remnants of Hurricane Emily in 1965, the remnants of Hurricane Joanne in 1972, the remnants of Hurricane Kathleen in 1976, and Hurricane Nora in 1997 after it was downgraded to a tropical storm, and Hurricane Kay, which made landfall in the Baja California Sur as a Category 1 Hurricane. Kay's remnants then passed over Southern California, which brought flooding and  wind gusts to some areas in the region.

In most cases, rainfall is the only effect that these cyclones have on California. Sometimes, the rainfall is severe enough to cause flooding and damage. For example, floods from Hurricane Kathleen devastated Ocotillo, California and killed several people.

Explanation for rarity

There are two basic reasons why tropical cyclones rarely strike California at tropical storm intensity or higher: Cold sea surface temperatures, and the usual upper level steering winds in the eastern Pacific, with sea surface temperatures being more important.

Tropical cyclones usually require very warm ocean water to depth, generally above 26.5 °C (80 °F) extending to a depth of 50 meters (160 ft). However, the waters off California are cold even in summer. They rarely rise above 24 °C (72 °F) in near-shore southern California, and usually remain below 17 °C (63 °F) along most of the rest of the coast and outer coastal waters, although El Niño events may warm the waters somewhat. This is due primarily to the extensive upwelling of colder sub-surface waters caused by the prevailing northwesterly winds acting through the Ekman effect. The winds drive surface water to the right of the wind flow, that is offshore, which draws water up from below to replace it. The upwelling further cools the already cool California Current which runs north to south along coastal California and even much of coastal Baja California. This is the same mechanism which produces coastal California's characteristic fog. By contrast, near-shore ocean temperatures along the East Coast from New York south to Virginia are normally near 26.5 °C (80 °F), and often near 29.4 °C (85 °F) from South Carolina to Florida in the summer and fall. This is also the reason there are so many more tropical fish found on the East Coast than on the West Coast. 

The second reason is the general path of tropical cyclones in the eastern Pacific. They generally move north-westward or westward due to steering by the prevailing upper-level winds, which takes them far out to sea and away from land.

These factors make eastern Pacific landfalls improbable north of about central Baja California. In those instances when upper level steering winds do allow a more northerly path, much cooler sea surface temperatures quickly weaken tropical cyclones that approach California, although torrential rainfall can still occur. For example, the September 24-hour rainfall record for Los Angeles is held by the 1939 Long Beach Tropical Storm, as of January 2007.

List of tropical cyclones
Hurricanes that affect California are mainly the remnants of hurricanes or tropical storms. In the twentieth century, only four eastern Pacific tropical cyclones have brought tropical storm-force winds to the Continental United States: the 1939 Long Beach Tropical Storm, Tropical Storm Joanne in 1972, Tropical Storm Kathleen in 1976, and Tropical Storm Nora in 1997.

Pre–1930
 After October 1854: A system considered to be a tropical cyclone made landfall over Northern California, just north of the Golden Gate.
 October 2, 1858: The 1858 San Diego hurricane passed very close to Southern California. It brought several hours of hurricane and gale-force winds to an area stretching from San Diego to Los Angeles. This storm was reconstructed as just missing making landfall, dissipating offshore.
 Sometime before October 14, 1858: Since this tropical cyclone is reported in a newspaper as being only "one of the most terrific and violent hurricanes ever noted", the report may imply the existence of an earlier hurricane in southern California. Other than occurring before the newspaper account was published (October 18, 1858), everything else about this "hurricane", including whether it even existed, is unknown.
 Before June or after October 1859: A system considered to be a tropical cyclone made landfall between Cape Mendocino and San Francisco Bay.
 August 11–12, 1873: Rain from a tropical storm fell on San Diego. The rain on August 12 set a record for wettest August day.
 July 20–21, 1902: The remnants of a hurricane brought rain to southern California.
 August 18–19, 1906: A tropical cyclone moved northward from the Gulf of California, and brought rain to southern California.
 September 15, 1910: The remnants of a hurricane brought rain to Santa Barbara County.
 August 26, 1915: The remnants of a tropical cyclone brought around an inch of rain to Riverside.
 September 11–12, 1918: The remnants of a tropical cyclone produced six inches (150 mm) of rain to the mountains of southern California.
 August 20–21, 1921: A tropical cyclone moved north from Baja California and into Arizona, producing rain in both southern California and Arizona.
 September 30, 1921: The remnants of a tropical cyclone moved northward from Baja California, and brought rain to Arizona and parts of California.
 September 18, 1929: A tropical cyclone in the Pacific Ocean dropped rain over southern California.

1930s
 September 28–October 1, 1932: The remnants of a hurricane brought four days of rain. Flash floods killed 15 people.
 August 25, 1935: A tropical cyclone moved northward from the south, and brought rain to southern California and parts of Arizona.
 August 9, 1936: A hurricane's remnants moved north and brought heavy rains to the Los Angeles area.
 September 4–7, 1939: The remnants of a hurricane brought over a year's worth of rain to parts of southern California.
 September 11–12, 1939: The remnants of a hurricane from the Gulf of California brought rain to parts of California.
 September 19–21, 1939: The remnants of a tropical cyclone brought rain to California.
 September 25, 1939: The 1939 California tropical storm made landfall near Long Beach. Winds were near  and rain was near 12 inches (300 mm). At sea, 48 people were killed. On land, 45 were killed in flooding as a nasty thunderstorm immediately preceded the tropical storm. This is the only known landfall in California by a tropical cyclone at tropical storm strength, during the twentieth century.

1940s
 September 1941: Moisture from a hurricane brought rain to California.
 September 9–10, 1945: The remnants of a tropical cyclone moved northward and brought rain to southern California.
 September 30–October 1, 1946: The remnants of a tropical storm brought several inches of rain to California.

1950s
 August 27–29, 1951: The remnants of a tropical cyclone brought enough rain to wash out some roads in southern California.
 September 19–21, 1952: The remnants of a hurricane brought rain to mountains in southern California.
 July 17–19, 1954: The remnants of a hurricane moved into Arizona, bringing rain to the state and parts of California.
 October 1–6, 1958: The remnants of a hurricane moved into Arizona, causing heavy rain in that state and in parts of California.
 September 11, 1959: The remnants of a hurricane generated some rain over California.

1960s
 September 9–10, 1960: The remnants of Hurricane Estelle generated rain over California.
 September 17–19, 1963: Tropical Storm Jennifer-Katherine dissipated over northern Baja California, and dropped several inches of rain over California.
 September 4–5, 1965: Hurricane Emily's remnants brought rainfall to California.

1970s

 September 30–October 1, 1971: Atlantic Hurricane Irene crossed Central America and became Hurricane Olivia. Olivia eventually re-curved and made landfall in Baja California, with the remnants bringing rain to California.
 September 3, 1972: Tropical Depression Hyacinth made landfall in California and produced rain in the area of Los Angeles.
 October 6, 1972: Hurricane Joanne made landfall in Mexico and managed to bring gale-force winds and rain to Arizona, as well as California.
 September 9–12, 1976: Hurricane Kathleen crossed the Baja California peninsula moved into California as a tropical storm. Yuma, Arizona reported sustained winds of 91 km/h (57 mph). Rains from Kathleen caused catastrophic damage to Ocotillo, California and killed three to six people.
 August 18–19, 1977: Hurricane Doreen degenerated into a remnant low off the coast of California. The remnants moved inland and caused flooding and crop damage as 7.01 inches (178 mm) of rain fell on Yuma Valley, Arizona.
 October 6–7, 1977: Hurricane Heather's remnants moved into Arizona, bringing 8.30 inches (211 mm) of rain to Nogales, Arizona and up to 14 inches (360 mm) of rainfall to the adjacent mountains. The remnants also brought significant rainfall to southern California. This led to significant flooding in both states.
 September 5–6, 1978: Tropical Depression Norman made landfall in California. Its remnants produced several inches of rain.

1980s
 June 29–30, 1980: Hurricane Celia's remnants produced a minor amount of rain over California.
 September 17–18, 1982: Remnants from Hurricane Norman generated rain over Arizona and southern California.
 September 24–26, 1982: The remnants of Hurricane Olivia produced over 7 inches (177 mm) of rain in California.
 September 20–21, 1983: The remnants of Hurricane Manuel produced rain in California.
 October 7, 1983: The very weak remnants of Hurricane Priscilla caused showers in Southern California.
 September 10–11, 1984: Hurricane Marie's weak remnants generated showers over Southern California.
 September 22–23, 1987: The remnants of Hurricane Norma generated thunderstorms over Southern California, which caused some flooding.
 October 5–12, 1987: Weather associated with Hurricane Ramon caused moderate to heavy rain in southern California. The highest amount noted was 2.14 inches (54 mm) at Camp Pendleton.
 September 1989: Hurricane Octave's remnants brought rain to California, doing minimal damage.

1990s

 June 1990: The remnants of Hurricane Boris briefly caused heavy rainfall in Southern California. This was one of the reasons why it was the wettest June in San Diego, since record-keeping began in 1850. Despite this, less than an inch (25 mm) of rain fell in most locations.
 July 1992: The remnants of Hurricane Darby caused cloudiness in California. These clouds were also enough to delay the landing of the Space Shuttle Columbia for a day, and cause it to land in Florida instead of California.
 August 1992: Hurricane Lester's remnants caused rain in extreme Southern California.
 August 5, 1997: Surf from Hurricane Guillermo caused rip currents near Corona Del Mar, and a place just north of Huntington Beach, injuring three people and killing one.
 August 19–20, 1997: Tropical Storm Ignacio's remnants produced gusty winds over the outer waters of California, and passed directly over the San Francisco Bay Area, before moving across the interior of the Pacific Northwest. Sporadic moderate to heavy rainfall was recorded in both California and the states of the Pacific Northwest.
 September 13–14, 1997: Hurricane Linda was at one point forecast to make landfall in Southern California. Instead, it moved out to sea, although large waves caused by Linda did wash five people off a jetty in Newport Beach. Also, Linda's outer rainbands generated thunderstorms over southern California, causing flash floods in some regions.
September 24 – 26, 1997: After making landfall in Baja California, Hurricane Nora maintained tropical storm status into California and Arizona. Moderate to heavy rains fell across southeast California and Arizona, with a new 24-hour maximum for Arizona  (305 mm (12 inches) falling in the Mogollon Rim). Damage totaled several hundred million, including $40 million (1997 USD) to lemon trees. There were a few indirect deaths caused by the hurricane.

2000s
 September 2000: The remnants of Hurricane Lane triggered thunderstorms across California.
 September 2001: Remnant moisture from Hurricane Flossie caused thunderstorms, lightning, and floods in Southern California. Lightning struck four people, killing two of them.
 September 30, 2001: Thunderstorms from the remnants of Hurricane Juliette caused minor damage to California and brought rain of less than an inch (25 mm) to the area.
 August 2003: Remnants of Hurricane Ignacio produced powerful thunderstorms in southern California.
 September 2003: Remnants of Hurricane Marty dropped large amounts of rainfall, in the southwestern United States, especially in Southern California and southwestern Arizona.
 September 20, 2005: Remnants of Hurricane Max brought a weak cold front, and heavy rain to Southern California.
 July 2006: Remnants of Tropical Storm Emilia caused unsettled weather across the southwestern United States. Rain from the remnants helped to extinguish the Horse Fire in southern California.
 September 2006: Remnants of Hurricane John triggered flash flood watches.
 August 26–27, 2007: Remnants of Hurricane Dean made landfall in Santa Barbara area, triggering heavy rains and minor flooding throughout the southern California Area. Early on August 27, the storm eventually reached Las Vegas, Nevada, and caused flash flooding there as well, before dissipating there later in the day.
 August 25, 2008: Remnants of Tropical Storm Julio reached Apple Valley, California, and Las Vegas, Nevada.
 August 27–29, 2009: Remnants of Tropical Storm Ignacio triggered heavy rains across northern and central California.
 September 4, 2009: Remnants of Hurricane Jimena caused severe thunderstorms to break out in eastern San Diego County, California, causing flash floods, and a short blackout that lasted for only a few hours.
 October 11–15, 2009: The remnants of Typhoon Melor affected California and broke several rainfall records. The storm system also opened up a Pineapple Express, an atmospheric river originating near Hawaii.

2010s

July 18–20, 2012: Associated moisture and clouds from the remnants of Hurricane Fabio generated scattered showers and isolated thunderstorms across the Los Angeles Basin.
September 5–7, 2012: Moisture from the remnants of Tropical Storm John brought scattered showers and thunderstorms to California.
August 25–26, 2013: Moisture from the remnants of Tropical Storm Ivo caused some thunderstorms and flooding in southern California.
September 3, 2013: Moisture from the remnants of Hurricane Kiko fueled the monsoon across the Southwestern United States, producing scattered showers and thunderstorms across the region.
August 26–29, 2014: Large swells from Hurricane Marie caused high waves and rip currents.
September 8, 2014: The remnants of Hurricane Norbert caused thunderstorms and flooding in Southern California.
September 16–17, 2014: Hurricane Odile's outer rainbands brought thunderstorms to parts of Southern California, as a tropical storm. The remnants of Hurricane Odile also caused damage across central and eastern San Diego County on September 16, 2014, generating high winds and several uncharacteristically powerful thunderstorms in the region. Wind gusts over 20 knots reportedly uprooting trees, felled branches, cut power lines, crushed several cars, and flipped at least one airplane at Montgomery Field Airport. Dry lightning generated by a line of severe thunderstorms in one of the rainbands set fire to a palm tree in San Diego and storm force wind gusts within those severe thunderstorms left 6000 customers without power.
October 6–7, 2014: Hurricane Simon's outer rainbands bring scattered thunderstorms and flash floods to parts of Southern California as a tropical storm, and later as a tropical depression, with a brief rain shower in San Diego County on October 7.
June 9–10, 2015: A low-pressure system containing the remnants of Hurricane Blanca brought showers to Southern California on June 9. Some flooding was reported in Santa Barbara County. On June 10, the low-pressure system moved north to the San Francisco Bay Area and brought scattered showers there as well. Many rainfall records were broken.
July 18–20, 2015: The remnants of Hurricane Dolores brought scattered showers and thunderstorms throughout Southern California, breaking many rainfall records and causing flooding. This has been more than combined by driest January and February ever record. One such flash flood caused a bridge to collapse which shut down Interstate 10 between Indio and Blythe, effectively shutting off the primary Phoenix-to-Los-Angeles route. However, the rain also helped firefighters contain the North Fire within 3 days.
August 6, 2015: Hurricane Guillermo interacted with a longwave trough in the subtropical jet to its northeast to spawn a rare dry-season atmospheric river, which went on to send moisture toward the San Francisco Bay Area, bringing a rare lightning storm to that area that night. Since the storm was dry and hardly brought any rain, the NWS issued a Red Flag Warning for that area.
September 8–15, 2015: The remnants of Hurricane Linda brought localized downpours from Santa Barbara to San Diego, California. On September 15, Los Angeles received 2.39 inches of rain, making it one of the wettest September days since records dating back to 1877, second only to 1939.
July 11–12, 2017: Dangerous rip currents from Hurricane Eugene combined with swells of 4 to 8 ft (1.2 to 2.4 m) across Southern California.
September 3–4, 2017: Moisture from Tropical Storm Lidia's remnant low brought flash flooding and thunderstorms to Southern California. Lidia's remnants also triggered a microburst event in Santa Barbara.
July 7–8, 2018: As a tropical storm, Hurricane Fabio brought rip currents to the coastline of California, and showers and humid conditions to Northern California.
August 9–11, 2018: Hurricane John brought high surf to the coast of Southern California.
October 1, 2018: Hurricane Rosa brought scattered thunderstorms to parts of Southern California as a tropical storm, triggering flash flood watches in San Diego County.
October 12, 2018: The remnants of Hurricane Sergio spawned numerous thunderstorms in Southern California, as well as triggering a high surf advisory along the coast. One thunderstorm made by the remnants of Sergio caused a power outage in parts of Los Angeles County, including Montebello, that lasted from 10:00 P.M. to 1:00 A.M. PDT.
 November 20, 2019: The remnants of Tropical Storm Raymond brought a heavy rainfall and snow in the mountains in Southern California, where the region had above-average seasonal rainfall since May that year.

2020s
 August 16–17, 2020: Moisture from Tropical Storm Fausto triggered massive thunderstorms across portions of Northern California. The thunderstorms produced mostly dry lightning, and sparked 367 wildfires across the state, several of which quickly exploded in size, threatening thousands of buildings and forcing thousands of people to evacuate. The massive SCU Lightning Complex, August Complex, CZU Lightning Complex, and North Complex fires were connected to the thunderstorms associated with Fausto.
 August 22, 2020: Remnant moisture from Hurricane Genevieve (2020) brought heavy rain to parts of Southern California, where a few large wildfires were occurring at the time.
 October 10, 2020: Remnant moisture from Hurricane Marie was entrained into an extratropical cyclone heading towards the West Coast of the U.S., which brought heavy rain to parts of Northern California, Oregon, and Washington.
 September 9-10, 2022: Hurricane Kay caused flash flooding in Southern California after downgrading to a tropical storm. A wind gust exceeding  was recorded in San Diego County.

Climatological statistics
Most tropical cyclones impacting California do so in the month of September. September 1939 was "unprecedented" in having four tropical cyclones impact the state.

Deadliest storms
The following is a list of all known tropical cyclone-related deaths in California.

Modern repeats
While rare, tropical cyclones do affect California, occasionally very seriously as far as rainfall is concerned.

Damage

A modern repeat of the 1858 storm is estimated to cause damages of hundreds of millions of dollars. A repeat of the 1939 tropical storm would cause around 200 million dollars in damage. The most serious damage would be due to rains rather than winds or storm surge, although distant hurricanes may still create heavy surf, possibly injuring or killing people. Nora caused millions in damage and skirted extreme southeastern California.

Preparedness
When Hurricane Linda was forecast to make landfall, statements about its possible impact were issued by the Oxnard, California office of the National Weather Service. They stressed the uncertainty of a forecast that far in the future.

When Nora was threatening, "unprecedented coordination" was required between the NHC and several other agencies. The coordination was "smooth and effective". However, no inland tropical storm warnings were issued for any area in the United States as Nora was approaching from the south.

There are seven Pacific Coast breakpoints in the United States. They are, from north to south, Point Piedras Blancas, Point Sal, Point Conception, Point Mugu, the mouth of the San Gabriel River, San Mateo Point, and the mouth of the Tijuana River (although places outside this area can be selected if conditions warrant). Should there be the threat of landfall, warnings or watches would be issued for those sections of the coast. It is highly unlikely that any tropical cyclone will threaten areas farther north, due to the stronger influence of the California Current.

See also

 List of tropical cyclones
 List of Arizona hurricanes
 List of Baja California Peninsula hurricanes
 Pacific hurricane
 Tropical cyclone

References

Citations

Bibliography

 USA Today: California's tropical storms  accessed September 29, 2005
 NOAA Tropical Cyclone FAQ Subject G9  accessed September 29, 2005
 The San Diego Hurricane of October 2, 1858  accessed September 29, 2005
 Unisys East Pacific Tropical Storm Tracking by Year accessed September 29, 2005
 NHC International Breakpoints table  accessed August 31, 2009

External links
 Unisys East Pacific Tropical Storm Tracking by Year
 Tropical Cyclone Rainfall for the Western United States
 NHC Tropical Cyclone Mexico Breakpoints Graphic

 California
California
 
Hurricanes
Hurricanes